Larraín Alcalde, or Estación Larraín Alcalde (Spanish for Larraín Alcalde Station), is a Chilean village located east of Pichilemu, Cardenal Caro Province.

Populated places in Pichilemu